Ó Curnín was the name of a brehon literary family of Breifne, related to its  kings, the O'Rourkes.

The surname is now rendered Courneen, Corneen, Coorneen, Curneen, or more rarely, Courtney.

See also

 The monk O'Curnin, a pious sage, died 1258
 Tomás Ó Curnín, ollav of the Fir Brefne,, died 1400
 Cormac Ó Curnín, died 1475
 Ruaidrí Ó Curnín, died 1496
 Conor Carragh Ó Curnín, died 1498
 Ferceirtne Ó Curnín, died 1519
 Domhnall Glas Ó Curnín, died 1519

Surnames
Irish families
Irish Brehon families
Surnames of Irish origin
Irish-language surnames
Families of Irish ancestry